Asianet Suvarna News  is a Kannada news channel owned by Jupiter Entertainment Ventures. The majority shareholder of the company is Rajeev Chandrasekhar, who is a Rajya Sabha member from the Bharatiya Janata Party. Launched on 31 March 2008, the channel was the third news channel to be aired in the Kannada language. The channel has telecast fabricated news and social media hoaxes on various occasions.

History 
Asianet suvarna news (formerly Suvarna News) was launched as a 24x7 Kannada news channel on 31 March 2008 by Asianet Communications Limited, the media enterprise of Jupiter Capital Private Limited. With the launch, Asianet Suvarna News became the third News channel in Kannada.

Suvarna News had existed as a news bulletin on Suvarna TV before the launch of its own channel in 2008. In November 2008, Star India acquired Asianet Communications excluding its news media operations. As a result, Suvarna News was placed under the Asianet News Network which continued to be owned by Jupiter Capital.

Suvarna News was rebranded as Asianet suvarna news on 01 Dec 2020.

Controversies 
The channel has a history of frequent changes in its editorial leadership. According to Shashidhar Bhat, the first and former editor of the channel, Rajeev Chandrasekhar maintains editorial control through the corporate management of the company. The channel has also been documented to have telecast fabricated news on multiple occasions; in instances picked up from unverified social media hoaxes.

According to some reports, personnel from Suvarna News had also provided technical assistance for setting up NaMo TV, BJP party propaganda channel, before and after the 2019 Indian general election.

The National Broadcasting Standards Authority (NBSA) finned Suvarna News was  Rs 50,000 for their biased coverage of the Tablighi Jamaat congregation of March 2020.

The Human rights organization, People's Union for Civil Liberties (PUCL) reported that Suvarna News along with other media channels, aided right wing Hindutva activists with biased coverage, during the attacks by right-wingers against the Karnataka's Christian community in 2021.

See also
List of Kannada-language television channels
Television in India
Media in Karnataka
Media of India

References

External links
 Official Website

Kannada-language television channels
Television stations in Bangalore
Television channels and stations established in 2008
24-hour television news channels in India
2008 establishments in Karnataka

Indian news websites